Daud Mohamed Omar is a Somali politician. He served as the Minister of Mineral Resources of Somalia from January 2014 to January 2015.

Personal life
Omar hails from the autonomous Puntland region in northeastern Somalia.

Career
On 17 January 2014, Omar was appointed Minister of Mineral Resources of Somalia by Prime Minister Abdiweli Sheikh Ahmed. His term in office ended on 27 January 2015, when new Prime Minister Omar Abdirashid Ali Sharmarke appointed Abdirizak Omar Mohamed as Omar's successor.

References

Living people
Ethnic Somali people
Government ministers of Somalia
Year of birth missing (living people)